Isham Randolph (February 24, 1687 – November 2, 1742) was a planter, a merchant, a public official, and a shipmaster. He was the maternal grandfather of United States President Thomas Jefferson.

Early life
Isham Randolph was born on the Turkey Island plantation in Henrico County, Virginia on February 24, 1687.  He was the third son of William Randolph (1650–1711) and Mary Isham ( 1659–1735).  His father was a colonist, landowner, planter, and merchant who served as the 26th Speaker of the Virginia House of Burgesses.

Randolph graduated from the College of William & Mary.

Marriage and children
In 1717, Isham Randolph married Jane Rogers in London at St. Paul's Church in the Shadwell parish (today east London). Jane was from a wealthy landed gentry family of England and Scotland. Isham and Jane Randolph moved to Virginia.  Together, they had nine children and were familially connected to many other prominent individuals:

 Jane Randolph (born 1720), who married Peter Jefferson and had nine children, including Thomas Jefferson, the third President of the United States.
 Mary Randolph (born October 1725 in Colonial Williamsburg), who married Colonel Charles Lewis of Buck Island and had eight children, including Charles Lilburn Lewis, one of the founders of Milton, Virginia.
 Isham Randolph (born ~1725), married Sarah Hargreaves in 1749, in Philadelphia.
 William Randolph (born ~1727), married Elizabeth Little on 31 July, 1761, in London.
 Thomas Randolph (born ~1728), who married Jane Cary, the daughter of Archibald Cary, in 1768.
 Elizabeth Randolph (born ~1730)
 Dorothea Randolph (born ~1732)
 Ann Randolph (born ~1735), who had four children in three marriages. She was the mother of James Pleasants Jr., the 22nd Governor of Virginia, via her last marriage to James Pleasants Sr.
 Susannah Randolph (born September 25, 1738), who married Carter Henry Harrison I (the brother of Benjamin Harrison V, the son of Benjamin Harrison IV, and the grandson of Benjamin Harrison III and Robert "King" Carter) and had six children. She was the great-grandmother of Carter Henry Harrison III, a five-time mayor of Chicago.

Career and death
Following his father, he was a prominent planter, merchant, public official, and also was a shipmaster. In London, Randolph was a well-established merchant and agent for the colony of Virginia. By the birth of his second daughter, Mary, in October 1725, he returned to Colonial Virginia.  In 1730, he built Dungeness, with English manor house style architecture on what became a large tobacco plantation, near Goochland, Virginia just west of Fine Creek (near the Fine Creek Mills Historic District). At the time that he acquired the land for Dungeness, it was frontier land, 40 miles from Richmond, Virginia. It became a house of "refinement and elegant hospitality" with a hundred or more servants.

Randolph was a prominent member of the Virginia planter class, often referred to as the "planter aristocracy", owning enslaved Africans which grew tobacco on his plantations. He also participated in the triangular trade, in addition to bringing indentured servants and slaves to colonial Virginia. 

Like his good friend, Colonel William Byrd, Randolph had an interest in science and engaged in amateur science circles while in London. He was noted for his abilities as a naturalist by members of the Royal Society. Upon the recommendation of naturalist John Bartram, Randolph was visited by botanist Peter Collinson and led an excursion to gather specimens in colonial Virginia. 

In 1738, Randolph became the adjutant general of Virginia. The following year, he became a colonel of the militia of Goochland County. He was also a member of the Virginia House of Burgesses. Randolph died in November 1742 and was buried on Turkey Island. In his will he assigned guardians of his children, including his son-in-law, Peter Jefferson (the father of President Thomas Jefferson.)

Ancestry

See also
 Ancestry of Thomas Jefferson
 Jane Randolph Jefferson § Ancestry

Notes

References

1687 births
1742 deaths
American planters
Jefferson family
People from Henrico County, Virginia
Isham Randolph